"Darlin'" is a 1990 soft rock and pop song recorded by Canadian singer Roch Voisine. It was released in January 1991 as the second single from his second studio album Double, on which it appears as the sixth track. It became a top five hit in France and Belgium (Wallonia); in addition, it was nominated for the Félix Award given in Quebec by the ADISQ in the category "Popular song of the year".

Versions
"Darlin'" was performed during Voisine's 1992 tour and thus included on the live albums Europe Tour and Roch Voisine Live, as well as on the compilation Best Of. Voisine recorded a new version of "Darlin'" first in 2003 on his album Je te serai fidèle, then in 2013 as a duet with the Montreal All-Star Choir, on his album Duophonique.

Chart performance
In France, "Darlin'" debuted at number 37 on the chart edition of 2 March 1991, then performed the biggest jump of the week, gaining 20 positions, entered the top ten in its fourth week and reached its highest position, number two, for non consecutive three weeks, being blocked by Scorpions's international hit "Wind of Change", and by Mylène Farmer's "Désenchantée" which successively topped the chart. It remained for a total of 12 weeks in the top ten and 19 weeks in the top 50. It achieved Silver status, awarded by the Syndicat National de l'Édition Phonographique. In Belgium (Wallonia), it featured for four weeks in the top ten, with a peak at number five on 11 May 1991. On the European Hot 100 Singles, it debuted at number 74 on 23 March 1991, reached a peak of number 12 in the ninth week, and fell off the top 100 after 16 weeks of presence, eight of them spent in the top 20.

Track listings
 CD maxi
 "Darlin'" — 4:15
 "Darlin'" (instrumental) — 4:15
 "Elle a peur des hirondelles" — 3:48

 7" single - France, Germany
 "Darlin'" — 4:15
 "Darlin'" (instrumental) — 4:15

 7" single - Canada
 "Darlin'" — 4:15
 "La Berceuse du petit diable" — 4:03

Charts

Weekly charts

Year-end charts

Certifications

Release history

References

1991 singles
Roch Voisine songs
1990 songs